"The Sunnyside of the Street" is a track from The Pogues' fifth album, Hell's Ditch, released in 1990. The song, composed by Shane MacGowan and Jem Finer, is an up-tempo celebration of an unrepentant libertine - a common theme for frontman and lyricist MacGowan. 

Songs about streets
1990 songs
The Pogues songs
Songs written by Jem Finer
Songs written by Shane MacGowan